Howard Ronald Kaback was an American biochemist, known for Kabackosomes, the cell-free membrane transport vesicles. He was the brother of Michael M. Kaback, pediatrician and human geneticist, who developed a screening program to detect and prevent Tay–Sachs disease, a rare and fatal genetic disorder most common in Ashkenazi Jews.

Biography 
Kaback was born in Philadelphia, Pennsylvania. He earned his BS at Haverford College in 1958 and his MD at The Einstein College of Medicine in 1962.  He interned at the Bronx Municipal Hospital Center in Pediatrics and did pre- and postdoctoral research at Einstein College in the laboratory of Adele B. Kostellow. In 1964 he moved to National Heart Institute to the laboratory of Earl R. Stadtman.

In 1970, he joined the Roche Institute of Molecular biology in Nutley, NJ where he later became Head of Biochemistry. In 1989 he became an Investigator of the Howard Hughes Medical Institute and Professor of Physiology and Microbiology, Immunology & Molecular Genetics, as well as a member of the Molecular Biology Institute at the University of California Los Angeles.

Career 
Ronald Kaback became interested in membrane transport at a time when studies on biological membranes were in their infancy, and in the early phase of his career, he developed a cell-free membrane system to study active transport. The system consisted of osmotically sealed membrane vesicles of defined orientation (right-side-out) that catalyze active transport essentially as well as intact cells, but lack subsequent metabolism of the solutes accumulated. These vesicles were dubbed Kabackosomes by the Dutch scientist Wilhelmus N. Konings, Kaback's close friend and early collaborator. In addition to transforming the field of transport from phenomenology to biochemistry, this seminal development caused him to forego the practice of pediatrics for a career in basic science.  The use of membrane vesicles from various sources has become a standard tool for testing models and performing hypothesis-driven research.

Kaback demonstrated quantitatively that an electrochemical H+ gradient is the immediate driving force for accumulation of many different solutes. Peter Mitchell who conceived and formulated the ‘’Chemiosmotic Hypothesis’’ considered these findings to be the most conclusive experimental support for the Hypothesis with respect to membrane transport. Kaback extended his interest to the molecular mechanism of membrane transport by focusing on the lactose permease of Escherichia coli (LacY; aka the lactose/H+ symporter), which is now a paradigm for the Major Facilitator Superfamily, arguably the largest group of membrane transport proteins.
With the emergence of molecular biology, he and his colleagues pioneered Cysteine-Scanning Mutagenesis in combination with chemical modification, as well as a battery of site-directed biophysical/biochemical techniques to demonstrate almost incontrovertibly that LacY functions by a mechanism involving alternating access of sugar- and proton-binding sites to either side of the membrane.  This general experimental approach is recognized today and has become a standard tool for membrane protein research.  Without a crystal structure, Kaback and colleagues succeeded in using the approach to obtain essential information about helix packing, the organization of the sugar-binding site, and the residues involved in H+ translocation and coupling.

He and his colleagues then obtained an X-ray crystal structure of LacY, an essential step towards understanding the molecular mechanism, which has had important impact on the field of membrane transport.
Ronald Kaback gives lectures regularly at international meetings.  His laboratory continues to extend studies on the evolution and mechanism of LacY and other symport proteins.

Awards and recognitions 
 Lewis S. Rosenstiel Award  (1973)
 Member of the American Academy of Arts and Sciences (1986)
 Member of the National Academy of Sciences (1987)
 Anatrace Membrane Protein Award (2007)
 Distinguished Alumni Achievement Award (2009)
 Peter Mitchell Memorial Medal (2012)

Selected publications 
The results of Kaback's studies are described in over 450 publications in peer-reviewed scientific journals. His research is also chronicled in textbooks, reference books and teaching materials in many languages for both undergraduate and graduate teaching.

External links 
 H. R. Kaback
 Kaback Lab University of California, Los Angeles
 Howard Kaback University of California, Los Angeles
 Ronald Kaback, M.D. at David Geffen School of Medicine University of California, Los Angeles
 Scientist studies 'third amino acid from left' University of California, Los Angeles

References 

1936 births
Living people
20th-century American physicians
Members of the United States National Academy of Sciences
American biochemists
Howard Hughes Medical Investigators